Ravindra Dattaram Waikar is a Shiv Sena politician from Maharashtra. He is a member of the 14th Maharashtra Legislative Assembly representing Jogeshwari East Assembly Constituency. He has been elected to Vidhan Sabha for three consecutive terms in 2009, 2014 and 2019.  He was appointed Maharashtra's minister of state, Higher & Technical Education in December, 2014. He was given the Housing, Higher & Technical Education portfolio. He was also given responsibility of being guardian minister of Ratnagiri district.

Positions held
 1992: Elected as corporator in Brihanmumbai Municipal Corporation (1st term)
 1997: Re-elected as corporator in Brihanmumbai Municipal Corporation (2nd term)
 2002: Re-elected as corporator in Brihanmumbai Municipal Corporation (3rd term)
 2007: Re-elected as corporator in Brihanmumbai Municipal Corporation (4th term)
 2006-2010: Standing Committee Chairman Brihanmumbai Municipal Corporation
 2009: Elected to Maharashtra Legislative Assembly
 2014: Re-elected to Maharashtra Legislative Assembly
 2014 - 2019: Minister of state Housing, Higher & Technical Education in Maharashtra State Government
 2014 - 2019: Guardian minister of Ratnagiri District
 2019: Re-elected to Maharashtra Legislative Assembly

See also
 Devendra Fadnavis ministry

References

External links
 Shiv Sena Home Page

Maharashtra MLAs 2014–2019
Living people
Shiv Sena politicians
Maharashtra MLAs 2009–2014
People from Mumbai Suburban district
People from Ratnagiri district
Marathi politicians
Year of birth missing (living people)